Paul Kraus (born 1944) is a Holocaust survivor and mesothelioma patient.  Kraus was born in and survived a Nazi forced labor camp during World War II. In 1997, Kraus was diagnosed with mesothelioma, a type of cancer caused by asbestos. Doctors originally believed that the cancer was terminal and he had only weeks to live, but Kraus is now considered to be the longest-lived mesothelioma survivor. Today, Kraus is an Australian author and cancer survivor whose writings focus on Australia, health, and spirituality. His book Surviving Mesothelioma and Other Cancers: A Patient’s Guide is a best-selling book on the subject.

Viehofen Forced-Labor camp 
Paul's mother, Clara Kraus, a Hungarian Jew, had a two-year-old boy, Peter, and was pregnant with Paul when the Nazis deported her and her children to Auschwitz concentration camp. Due to rail destruction by Allied bombing, they were sent to a forced labor camp established in the Viehofen flood plain near St. Pölten, Lower Austria. Approximately 180 men, women and children lived in three barracks in the camp where they were used as forced labor for the state-owned Traisen-Wasserverband company based in St. Pölten and the surrounding area.

Paul Kraus was born on the grounds of the camp on 20 October 1944. Inadequate nutrition, lack of hygiene, shootings by the SS, failed attempts to escape, and bombings by the Allies caused many deaths at the camp. Clara Kraus escaped with her toddler Peter and infant son Paul in January 1945 and survived a cross-country trek in winter to Clara's home in German-occupied Budapest. There, she was reunited with her husband, who survived imprisonment in the Mauthausen-Gusen concentration camp. At the end of World War II, the family emigrated to Australia.

Mesothelioma 
Paul Kraus received his Bachelor of Arts degree at Macquarie University and a Master of Arts and Education from the University of Sydney. During a summer vacation as an undergraduate student, he worked adjacent to an asbestos factory, where he was exposed to fine asbestos dust. Decades later, he was diagnosed with peritoneal mesothelioma, a cancer known to be caused by exposure from asbestos. Due to his advanced metastases, doctors believed he only had weeks to live.

Over the last 30 years, Kraus has worked as an author and educator. He has written several books, including books co-written with Ian Gawler.

Selected works
Faith, Hope, Love and Laughter – How They Heal
Not So Fabulous 50s: Images of a Migrant Childhood
A New Australian, a New Australia
Surviving Cancer: Inspirational Stories of Hope and Healing 
Prayers, Promises & Prescriptions for Healing
Surviving Mesothelioma and Other Cancers: A Patient's Guide
Mother Courage: From the Holocaust to Australia

References

External links
Paul Kraus’ Mesothelioma Website

1944 births
Australian health and wellness writers
Australian autobiographers
People from Sankt Pölten
Living people
Austrian emigrants to Australia